The Borne government is the forty-third government of the French Fifth Republic, formed on 16 May 2022 and headed by Élisabeth Borne as Prime Minister under the presidency of Emmanuel Macron.

The government has survived multiple votes of no confidence: one in July 2022, three in October 2022 in response to the use of Article 49.3 by the government to pass a social security bill, and two in March 2023 again in response of the use of Article 49.3 to pass a pension reform bill.

Context

Formation 
On 16 May 2022, Jean Castex tendered the resignation of his government to the President of the Republic. The same day, the Élysée Palace informed the press that Élisabeth Borne, incumbent Minister of Labour, Employment and Economic Inclusion, would replace him and form a new government, the fourth since the election of Macron.

Initial composition 

On 20 May 2022, the composition of the government (excluding the Prime Minister) was announced by Alexis Kohler from the steps of the Élysée Palace. The members of the previous government remained in office to deal with current and urgent matters until the appointment of the new government, as provided for in the French Constitution.

Ministers 

Deputy Ministers

State Secretaries

Change of the composition of the government in June 2022 
In June 2022 Yaël Braun-Pivet resigned to be a candidate for the presidency of the National Assembly. She was replaced, as interim, by Elisabeth Borne.

Change of the composition of the government in July 2022 
Following the French legislative elections, a change in the composition of the government was announced on 4 July 2022.

The reshuffle of the Borne government comes following the 2022 legislative elections. Emmanuel Macron's party La République En Marche! with the Ensemble coalition did not obtain an absolute majority in the National Assembly but only a relative majority. This therefore forced Prime Minister Elisabeth Borne to review her government to be more in line with the new legislature. In particular, the president and then the prime minister met  with the party leaders and then the leaders of the parliamentary groups in order to find if the idea of a coalition government can be implemented.

Ministers 

Deputy Ministers

State Secretaries

Civil service 

 Aurelien Rousseau - Chief of Staff to the Prime Minister

References 

French governments
Cabinets established in 2022
Emmanuel Macron
2022 establishments in France
Current governments